New Hutton is a village and civil parish in South Lakeland, Cumbria, England. At the 2011 Census, it had a population of 348.

New Hutton is east of Kendal, and north of Old Hutton. The M6 motorway runs through the eastern edge of the parish, and the A684 road across it east–west.

The village is south of the A684. The church of St Stephen is in the centre of the village.

There is a parish council, the lowest tier of local government.

Listed buildings

The parish contains 12 listed buildings, all at grade II, including the church.

References

External links
 Cumbria County History Trust: New Hutton (nb: provisional research only – see Talk page)
New Hutton website

 

Villages in Cumbria
Civil parishes in Cumbria
South Lakeland District